Conner Weigman (born August 8, 2003) is an American football quarterback who currently plays for the Texas A&M Aggies.

Early life and high school
Weigman grew up in Cypress, Texas and attended Bridgeland High School, where he played baseball and football. He became Bridgeland's starting quarterback during his sophomore season. Weigman passed for 3,808 yards and 42 touchdowns against 11 interceptions in his junior season. As a senior, Weigman passed for 2,588 yards and 29 touchdowns with six interceptions while also rushing for 754 yards and nine touchdowns. At the end of the season he was named the Offensive Player of the Year by the Houston Touchdown Club and the National High School Quarterback Of The Year by the National Quarterback Club

Weigman was rated a five-star recruit and committed to play college football at Texas A&M after considering offers from Arkansas, Baylor, Florida, Oklahoma, and Texas. He was also considered one of the best baseball prospects in Texas and announced his intention to play for the Texas A&M Aggies baseball team as a shortstop.

College career
Weigman joined the Texas A&M Aggies as an early enrollee in January 2022. He also withdrew his name from the 2022 Major League Baseball draft. Weigman ultimately decided against playing baseball in order to participate in spring practices.  Weigman entered his true freshman season as Texas A&M's third-string quarterback with the intention of redshirting the year. Weigman made his first collegiate start in week 9 against no. 15 Ole Miss, finishing 28-of-44 for 338 yards and four touchdowns in the 28–31 loss.

Statistics

Source:

References

External links
Texas A&M bio

Living people
Players of American football from Texas
American football quarterbacks
Texas A&M Aggies football players
2003 births